The Club of Pioneers is a worldwide network of the oldest continuing association football clubs from each country.

The Club of Pioneers was founded in 2013 by Sheffield FC, the first and oldest association football club in the world. The Club of Pioneers aims to discover and connect the world's oldest existing football clubs, to build a global network of like-minded football clubs to promote the importance of football history and the grass roots and amateur game.

Definition of Pioneers 
According to today's historical knowledge and available sources of football history,  the Sheffield Football Club Foundation awards the honorary membership within the Club of Pioneers to those football clubs, who: 

 Still play football in amateur or professional football competition today. 
 Have constantly existed as a sports organisation since their date of foundation.  (exceptions for periods of inactivity due to external reasons, for example war.)
 Are by definition the oldest existing football club of their country, referring to the foundation date of a football team as part of a multi-sport club or as a proper football club, playing to association football rules. 
 Live and support the values of the game and amateur football: Integrity, Respect, Community.

Team Work
The club has a work team made up of great professionals who have been working in the field of football for many years.

President:  Richard Tims
Partnerships: Dylan Ralph
Ambassador: Tom Simons (Belgium)
Latam Ambassador: Juan Alvarez (France - Uruguay)
Ambassador: Robert Zitzmann (Germany)

Current members

Pioneers Cup 
Members of the Club of Pioneers, can also take part in a Pioneers Cup: a football tournament where only 'oldest' clubs can participate, to showcase their pioneering heritage.  The teams themselves do not play, but are represented by 'Pioneer' teams of fans, former-players, and staff of the club.

Notes

Sources 
 Sheffield fc - the world's first.
 Cliftonville fc : Introduction to the Club of Pioneers, 10 March 2013
 Genoa CFC
 St-Gallen fc
 R Antwerp FC - Club of Pioneers 
 Globalise then localize Game of the People, 27 juli 2013
 Sheffield Pioneers Cup BBC.com, 17 November 2013
 El Recreativo de Huelva ingresa con honores en el “Club of Pioneers”, Cihefe.es, 5 May 2013
 Entra en el ‘Club of Pioneers’ HuelvaYa.es, 5 May 2013
 KHFC new member for the Club of Pioneers TheStar.co.uk 5 September 2014
 St-Gallen aufnahme in Club of Pioneers Blick.ch, 23 September 2015
 FC St-Gallen kommt inden Club of Pioneers Tagblatt, 22 August 2014
 Antwerp Pioneers Cup GvA, 18 May 2016
 Antwerp treedt toe tot Club of Pioneers GvA, 23 May 2016
 Fola Esch, entering Club of Pioneers FuPa Lux, 14 November 2016
 Fola fir 110. Anniversaire am "Club of Pioneers" opgeholl  RTL.lu, 13 December 2016
 Odds Ballklubb celebrated their place in "Club of Pioneers" at halftime in their match against Strømsgodset 13 May 2017
 Odds BK - Club of Pioneers
 Vi ønsker at folk skal kjenne til Odd når de snakker om fotball i Norge Vardens, 15 May 2017
 Classic Football Shirts, 19 July 2017
 Savages celebrate in style The Witness, 21 August 2017
 Academica integrase no Club of Pioneers Académica-oaf.pt, 4 November 2017
 Academica integrase no Club of Pioneers DSport.pt, 6 November 2017
 First Vienna FC neue mitglieder ,21 April 2018
  "Club website" ,5 November 2018
 ljuboten-enters-club-of-pioneers "Ljuboten enters Club of Pioneers" ,11 May 2019
 https://www.corporacionwanderers.cl/noticias/ceremonia-de-ingreso-club-of-pioneers/ "Corporation Wanderers", 24 August 2019

External links
 Club of Pioneers' home page
 Marca

Association football organizations
2013 establishments in the United Kingdom
Sports organizations established in 2013